Bolshaya Khalan is a rural locality (a selo) and the administrative center of Bolshekhalanskoye Rural Settlement, Korochansky District, Belgorod Oblast, Russia. The population was 876 as of 2010. There are 8 streets.

Geography 
Bolshaya Khalan is located 24 km northeast of Korocha (the district's administrative centre) by road. Bolshoye Peschanoye is the nearest rural locality.

References 

Rural localities in Korochansky District
Novooskolsky Uyezd